Chroma ATE Inc. 致茂電子, is a Taiwanese electronic test and measurement instrumentation company founded in 1984. The company develops and manufactures a range of electronic test and measurement equipment, automated testing equipment (ATE), signal generator, power supplies, and intelligent manufacturing execution systems (MES). The company is part of Taiwan-based conglomerate Chroma Group. The company reported revenues of NT$16.9 billion with net income of NT$2.5 billion in 2018.

Product Divisions and Testing Solutions 

Chroma's product divisions develop various automated test systems and automation for the following categories:
Power Electronics
LED/Lighting & Drivers
Electric Vehicles
Batteries
Photovoltaics
Video and Colors
LCD / LCM
Automated Optical Inspection 
Passive component and Electrical Safety
Semiconductor / IC
Thermoelectric Test & Control
Manufacturing Execution System (MES)
VCSEL Testing
Fabry–Pérot laser and Distributed Feedback Laser Testing
Solar Cell Testing
PIN photodiode and Avalanche photodiode Testing

Operations
The company operates a number of engineering service offices worldwide, including in the United States, Europe and Japan, for client service and support.

The company's global network includes the following:
Chroma USA: Chroma USA (Irvine, CA), Chroma System Solutions (Irvine, CA).
Chroma Europe: Netherlands.
Chroma Japan: Yokohama.
Chroma China: Beijing, Nanjing, Shanghai, Suzhou, Chongqing, Xiamen, Shenzhen, Dongguan.

Associated companies

Innovative Nanotech
Touch Cloud
MAS Automative
Testar Electronis
ADIVIC Technology
EVT Technology
Chroma New Material

See also

List of companies in Taiwan
致茂電子

References

External links
Analyst Report on Global Semiconductor/IC Test Solutions Market Outlook 2018-2025
Analyst Report on Chroma ATE Inc (2360) - Financial and Strategic SWOT Analysis Review
Gartner Insights on Global Benchtop Phase Analyzers Market Report 2019

1984 establishments in Taiwan
Electronics companies established in 1984
Electronics companies of Taiwan
Taiwanese brands
Companies listed on the Taiwan Stock Exchange